Christ Church, Cheltenham is an Anglican church and congregation located at Christchurch and Malvern Roads, in the Lansdown section of Cheltenham, Gloucestershire, United Kingdom.

The Gothic Revival church building was designed by architects Robert W. & Charles Jearrad, construction began in November 1837, and the church was consecrated on 21 January 1840.

The current website can be found at

References

Gothic Revival church buildings in England
Gothic Revival architecture in Gloucestershire
Churches in Cheltenham
Church of England church buildings in Gloucestershire
Grade II listed churches in Gloucestershire
Churches completed in 1840
1840 establishments in England